Jean Auguste Ross (September 6, 1851 – February 3, 1920) was a Canadian physician and politician.

Born in Rimouski, Canada East, the son of John Ross and Caroline Talbot, Ross was educated at Ste. Anne and Rimouski Seminaries. He received his medical education from Université Laval and then started practicing medicine in Rimouski. He was also Coroner for the District of Rimouski and a Quarantine Officer for the port. He was first elected to the House of Commons of Canada for the electoral district of Rimouski in an 1897 by-election. A Liberal, he was re-elected in 1900, 1904, and 1908. He was defeated in 1911.

References
 
 

1851 births
1920 deaths
Liberal Party of Canada MPs
Members of the House of Commons of Canada from Quebec
Université Laval alumni
Canadian coroners